The moment magnitude scale (MMS; denoted explicitly with  or Mw, and generally implied with use of a single M for magnitude) is a measure of an earthquake's magnitude ("size" or strength) based on its seismic moment. It was defined in a 1979 paper by Thomas C. Hanks and Hiroo Kanamori. Similar to the local magnitude/Richter scale defined by Charles Francis Richter in 1935, it uses a logarithmic scale; small earthquakes have approximately the same magnitudes on both scales. Despite the difference, news media often says "Richter scale" when referring to the moment magnitude scale.

Moment magnitude is considered the authoritative magnitude scale for ranking earthquakes by size. It is more directly related to the energy of an earthquake than other scales, and does not saturate—that is, it does not underestimate magnitudes as other scales do in certain conditions. It has become the standard scale used by seismological authorities like the U.S. Geological Survey for reporting large earthquakes (typically M > 4), replacing the local magnitude and surface wave magnitude scales. Subtypes of the moment magnitude scale (etc.) reflect different ways of estimating the seismic moment.

History

Richter scale: the original measure of earthquake magnitude 

At the beginning of the twentieth century, very little was known about how earthquakes happen, how seismic waves are generated and propagate through the earth's crust, and what information they carry about the earthquake rupture process; the first magnitude scales were therefore empirical. The initial step in determining earthquake magnitudes empirically came in 1931 when the Japanese seismologist Kiyoo Wadati showed that the maximum amplitude of an earthquake's seismic waves diminished with distance at a certain rate. Charles F. Richter then worked out how to adjust for epicentral distance (and some other factors) so that the logarithm of the amplitude of the seismograph trace could be used as a measure of "magnitude" that was internally consistent and corresponded roughly with estimates of an earthquake's energy. He established a reference point and the now familiar ten-fold (exponential) scaling of each degree of magnitude, and in 1935 published what he called the "magnitude scale", now called the local magnitude scale, labeled . (This scale is also known as the Richter scale, but news media sometimes use that term indiscriminately to refer to other similar scales.)

At greater depths, distances, or magnitudes the surface waves are greatly reduced, and the local magnitude scale underestimates the magnitude, a problem called saturation. Additional scales were developed – a surface-wave magnitude scale by Beno Gutenberg in 1945, a body-wave magnitude scale by Gutenberg and Richter in 1956, and a number of variants – to overcome the deficiencies of the  scale, but all are subject to saturation. These had  magnitudes of 8.5 and 8.4 respectively but were notably more powerful than other M 8 earthquakes; their moment magnitudes were closer to 9.6 and 9.3.

Single couple or double couple 
The study of earthquakes is challenging as the source events cannot be observed directly, and it took many years to develop the mathematics for understanding what the seismic waves from an earthquake can tell us about the source event. An early step was to determine how different systems of forces might generate seismic waves equivalent to those observed from earthquakes.

The simplest force system is a single force acting on an object. If it has sufficient strength to overcome any resistance it will cause the object to move ("translate"). A pair of forces, acting on the same "line of action" but in opposite directions, will cancel; if they cancel (balance) exactly there will be no net translation, though the object will experience stress, either tension or compression. If the pair of forces are offset, acting along parallel but separate lines of action, the object experiences a rotational force, or torque. In mechanics (the branch of physics concerned with the interactions of forces) this model is called a couple, also simple couple or single couple. If a second couple of equal and opposite magnitude is applied their torques cancel; this is called a double couple. A double couple can be viewed as "equivalent to a pressure and tension acting simultaneously at right angles".

In 1923 Hiroshi Nakano showed that certain aspects of seismic waves could be explained in terms of a double couple model. This led to a three-decade long controversy over the best way to model the seismic source: as a single couple, or a double couple. While Japanese seismologists favored the double couple, most seismologists favored the single couple. Although the single couple model had some short-comings, it seemed more intuitive, and there was a belief – mistaken, as it turned out – that the elastic rebound theory for explaining why earthquakes happen required a single couple model. In principle these models could be distinguished by differences in the radiation patterns of their S-waves, but the quality of the observational data was inadequate for that.

 but not from a single couple. This was confirmed as better and more plentiful data coming from the World-Wide Standard Seismograph Network (WWSSN) permitted closer analysis of seismic waves. Notably, in 1966 Keiiti Aki showed that the seismic moment of the 1964 Niigata earthquake as calculated from the seismic waves on the basis of a double couple was in reasonable agreement with the seismic moment calculated from the observed physical dislocation.

Dislocation theory 
A double couple model suffices to explain an earthquake's far-field pattern of seismic radiation, but tells us very little about the nature of an earthquake's source mechanism or its physical features. While slippage along a fault was theorized as the cause of earthquakes (other theories included movement of magma, or sudden changes of volume due to phase changes), observing this at depth was not possible, and understanding what could be learned about the source mechanism from the seismic waves requires an understanding of the source mechanism.

Modeling the physical process by which an earthquake generates seismic waves required much theoretical development of dislocation theory, first formulated by the Italian Vito Volterra in 1907, with further developments by E. H. Love in 1927. More generally applied to problems of stress in materials, an extension by F. Nabarro in 1951 was recognized by the Russian geophysicist A. V. Vvedenskaya as applicable to earthquake faulting. In a series of papers starting in 1956 she and other colleagues used dislocation theory to determine part of an earthquake's focal mechanism, and to show that a dislocation – a rupture accompanied by slipping — was indeed equivalent to a double couple.

In a pair of papers in 1958, J. A. Steketee worked out how to relate dislocation theory to geophysical features. Numerous other researchers worked out other details, culminating in a general solution in 1964 by Burridge and Knopoff, which established the relationship between double couples and the theory of elastic rebound, and provided the basis for relating an earthquake's physical features to seismic moment.

Seismic moment 
Seismic moment – symbol  – is a measure of the fault slip and area involved in the earthquake. Its value is the torque of each of the two force couples that form the earthquake's equivalent double-couple. (More precisely, it is the scalar magnitude of the second-order moment tensor that describes the force components of the double-couple.) Seismic moment is measured in units of Newton meters (N·m) or Joules, or (in the older CGS system) dyne-centimeters (dyn-cm).

The first calculation of an earthquake's seismic moment from its seismic waves was by Keiiti Aki for the 1964 Niigata earthquake. He did this two ways.  First, he used data from distant stations of the WWSSN to analyze long-period (200 second) seismic waves (wavelength of about 1,000 kilometers) to determine the magnitude of the earthquake's equivalent double couple. Second, he drew upon the work of Burridge and Knopoff on dislocation to determine the amount of slip, the energy released, and the stress drop (essentially how much of the potential energy was released). In particular, he derived a now famous equation that relates an earthquake's seismic moment to its physical parameters:

(Modern formulations replace  with the equivalent , known as the "geometric moment" or "potency".) By this equation the moment determined from the double couple of the seismic waves can be related to the moment calculated from knowledge of the surface area of fault slippage and the amount of slip. In the case of the Niigata earthquake the dislocation estimated from the seismic moment reasonably approximated the observed dislocation.

Seismic moment is a measure of the work (more precisely, the torque) that results in inelastic (permanent) displacement or distortion of the earth's crust. It is related to the total energy released by an earthquake. However, the power or potential destructiveness of an earthquake depends (among other factors) on how much of the total energy is converted into seismic waves. This is typically 10% or less of the total energy, the rest being expended in fracturing rock or overcoming friction (generating heat).

Nonetheless, seismic moment is regarded as the fundamental measure of earthquake size, representing more directly than other parameters the physical size of an earthquake. As early as 1975 it was considered "one of the most reliably determined instrumental earthquake source parameters".

Introduction of an energy-motivated magnitude Mw 

Most earthquake magnitude scales suffered from the fact that they only provided a comparison of the amplitude of waves produced at a standard distance and frequency band; it was difficult to relate these magnitudes to a physical property of the earthquake. Gutenberg and Richter suggested that radiated energy Es could be estimated as

(in Joules). Caltech seismologist Hiroo Kanamori recognized this deficiency and took the simple but important step of defining a magnitude based on estimates of radiated energy, where the "w" stood for work (energy):
 

Kanamori recognized that measurement of radiated energy is technically difficult since it involves the integration of wave energy over the entire frequency band. To simplify this calculation, he noted that the lowest frequency parts of the spectrum can often be used to estimate the rest of the spectrum. The lowest frequency asymptote of a seismic spectrum is characterized by the seismic moment, . Using an approximate relation between radiated energy and seismic moment (which assumes stress drop is complete and ignores fracture energy),

Moment magnitude scale 

The formula above made it much easier to estimate the energy-based magnitude , but it changed the fundamental nature of the scale into a moment magnitude scale.

 combined their work to define a new magnitude scale based on estimates of seismic moment

where  is defined in newton meters (N·m).

Current use 

Moment magnitude is now the most common measure of earthquake size for medium to large earthquake magnitudes, but in practice, seismic moment, the seismological parameter it is based on, is not measured routinely for smaller quakes. For example, the United States Geological Survey does not use this scale for earthquakes with a magnitude of less than 3.5, which includes the great majority of quakes.

For these events, the preferred magnitude is the moment magnitude , not Richter's local magnitude .

Definition 
The moment magnitude  is a dimensionless value defined by Hiroo Kanamori as

where  is the seismic moment in dyne⋅cm (10−7 N⋅m). The constant values in the equation are chosen to achieve consistency with the magnitude values produced by earlier scales, such as the local magnitude and the surface wave magnitude.

Relations between seismic moment, potential energy released and radiated energy 
Seismic moment is not a direct measure of energy changes during an earthquake. The relations between seismic moment and the energies involved in an earthquake depend on parameters that have large uncertainties and that may vary between earthquakes. Potential energy is stored in the crust in the form of elastic energy due to built-up stress and gravitational energy. During an earthquake, a portion  of this stored energy is transformed into
 energy dissipated  in frictional weakening and inelastic deformation in rocks by processes such as the creation of cracks
 heat 
 radiated seismic energy 

The potential energy drop caused by an earthquake is related approximately to its seismic moment by

It could vary highly from one earthquake to another. Two earthquakes with identical  but different  would have released different .

The radiated energy caused by an earthquake is approximately related to seismic moment by

These two quantities are far from being constants. For instance,  depends on rupture speed; it is close to 1 for regular earthquakes but much smaller for slower earthquakes such as tsunami earthquakes and slow earthquakes. Two earthquakes with identical  but different  or  would have radiated different .

Choy and Boatwright defined in 1995 the energy magnitude

 

where  is in J (N·m).

Comparative energy released by two earthquakes 

Similarly, if one assumes  is the same for all earthquakes, one can consider  as a measure of the energy Es radiated by earthquakes.

Under these assumptions, the following formula, obtained by solving for  the equation defining , allows one to assess the ratio  of energy release (potential or radiated) between two earthquakes of different moment magnitudes,  and :

As with the Richter scale, an increase of one step on the logarithmic scale of moment magnitude corresponds to a 101.5 ≈ 32 times increase in the amount of energy released, and an increase of two steps corresponds to a 103 = 1000 times increase in energy.

Comparison with TNT equivalents 

To make the significance of the magnitude value plausible, the seismic energy released during the earthquake is sometimes compared to the effect of the conventional chemical explosive TNT.
The seismic energy  results from the above mentioned formula according to Gutenberg and Richter to

 

or converted into Hiroshima bombs:

For comparison of seismic energy (in joules) with the corresponding explosion energy, a value of 4.2 - 109 joules per ton of TNT applies.
The table illustrates the relationship between seismic energy and moment magnitude.

The end of the scale is at the value 10.6 corresponding to the assumption that at this value the earth's crust would have to break apart completely.

Subtypes of Mw 
Various ways of determining moment magnitude have been developed, and several subtypes of the  scale can be used to indicate the basis used.

  – Based on moment tensor inversion of long-period (~10 – 100 s) body-waves.
  – From a moment tensor inversion of complete waveforms at regional distances (~ 1,000 miles). Sometimes called RMT.
  – Derived from a centroid moment tensor inversion of intermediate- and long-period body- and surface-waves.
  – Derived from a centroid moment tensor inversion of the W-phase.
  – Developed by Seiji Tsuboi for quick estimation of the tsunami potential of large near-coastal earthquakes from measurements of the P-waves, and later extended to teleseismic earthquakes in general.

See also 
 Earthquake engineering
 Lists of earthquakes
 Seismic magnitude scales

Notes

Sources 

 .

 .

 .

 .

 .

 .

 .

 .

 .

 .

 .

 .

 .

 .

 .

 .

 .

 .

 .

 .

 .

 .

 .

 

 .

 .

 .

 .

 .

 .

 .

 .

 .

 .

 .

 .

 .

 .

 .

 .

 .

 .

 .

 .

External links 
 USGS: Measuring earthquakes
 Perspective: a graphical comparison of earthquake energy release – Pacific Tsunami Warning Center

Seismic magnitude scales
Geophysics
Logarithmic scales of measurement